Harmony Grove may refer to:

Harmony Grove, West Virginia, an unincorporated community in Monongalia County
Harmony Grove, Wisconsin, an unincorporated community in Columbia County
Harmony Grove Cemetery, in Salem, Massachusetts
Harmony Grove High School (disambiguation), multiple schools